Chesapeake often refers to:

Chesapeake people, a Native American tribe also known as the Chesepian
Chesapeake Bay
Delmarva Peninsula, also known as the Chesapeake Peninsula

Chesapeake may also refer to:

Populated places

In Virginia 
 Chesapeake, Virginia, an independent city
 Phoebus, Virginia, formerly known as Chesapeake City
 Chesapeake, Northampton County, Virginia, an unincorporated community

In other US states 
Chesapeake, Indiana, defunct
Chesapeake, Missouri
Chesapeake, Ohio
Chesapeake, Tennessee, a neighborhood of Nashville
Chesapeake, West Virginia

Schools 
 Chesapeake High School, Anne Arundel County, Maryland
 Chesapeake High School, Baltimore, Maryland
 Chesapeake College, public community college based in Wye Mills, Maryland

Ships 
United States lightship Chesapeake (LV-116), a lightvessel
USS Chesapeake (1799), an American frigate captured by HMS Shannon in 1813
USS Patapsco (1799), a sloop originally named USS Chesapeake but renamed in 1799 while still under construction
USS Chesapeake (1898), a training ship renamed USS Severn on 15 June 1905
USS Chesapeake (ID-3395), a freighter
USS Chesapeake (AOT-5084) 
HMS Chesapeake (1855), a Royal Navy frigate
Chesapeake was a British ship launched in 1799 that in 1840 was sold to an American trading house at Canton, which named her Chesapeake, and then sold her to the Qing Dynasty, which purchased her for the Imperial Chinese Navy. The British Royal Navy destroyed her on 27 February 1841 during the Battle of First Bar at the onset of the First Opium War.

Music, entertainment, and books
Chesapeake (band), a folk-rock/progressive bluegrass band from Maryland
Chesapeake (novel), a novel published in 1978 by James Michener
Chesapeake (album), the third full-length album by Rachael Yamagata
Chesapeake Shores, Canadian/American television drama
Chesapeake Shores, novel series written by Sherryl Woods

Transportation
Chesapeake (train), an Amtrak commuter service between Philadelphia and Washington, D.C.
Chesapeake (train, 1994–1995), an Amtrak service between New York City and Richmond, Virginia
Chesapeake and Ohio Railway, a former American railroad, operating from 1869 to 1972 in the state of Virginia
Chesapeake and Ohio Canal
Chesapeake Bay Bridge, also known as the Bay Bridge, a bridge crossing the Chesapeake Bay
Chesapeake Bay Bridge–Tunnel, bridge-tunnel crossing the mouth of the Chesapeake Bay

Other
Chesapeake Bay Retriever, a breed of dog
Chesapeake Corporation, a historical holding company associated with Van Sweringen railroad holdings
Chesapeake Energy, an American publicly held producer of natural gas
Chesapeake Energy Arena, a multi-purpose arena located in downtown Oklahoma City
Chesapeake Utilities, an American energy services company focusing on distribution of natural gas and propane
Chesapeake Mill, in Wickham, Hampshire, England, a building constructed from the timbers of the USS Chesapeake
The Vought Chesapeake, British name for the United States built dive bomber, the Vought SB2U Vindicator
 Hemoglobin Chesapeake, a special form of hemoglobin that causes polycythemia

See also
 Battle of the Chesapeake, a naval battle in 1781 between a British fleet and a combined French-American fleet